Trypoxylon scutatum  is a predatory wasp in the family Crabronidae.

Distribution
This species is present in Europe.

Description
These quite large wasps have a shiny black body, with large eyes. The hull that borders the frontal shield passes between the posterior ocelli and the anterior ocellum. It shows a strongly obtuse ventral angle, and a small enclosed space. The first gastral segment is rather short, especially in males.

References

Crabronidae
Insects described in 1867